The 2005 Churchill Cup was held between 14 June and 21 June 2005 in  Edmonton, Canada. It was the third edition of the Churchill Cup competition. three of the four rugby union teams taking part in the 2004 men's competition,  Canada, England A, the USA, returned to compete, while Argentina A replaced the Māori.

There was no women's event, although a similar event, the 2005 Canada Cup did take place.

Format

The competition took on a straight 'knock-out' format. Four teams played in two semi-final matches, with the North American sides kept apart. The winners of each semi final competed in the final match, while the losers took part in a 3rd/4th place playoff. Four matches were played over a period of two weeks.

Results

Semi-finals

Final

Consolation final

See also
 Churchill Cup

References

External links
 Churchill Cup official site

2005
2005 rugby union tournaments for national teams
International rugby union competitions hosted by Canada
2004–05 in English rugby union
2005 in Canadian rugby union
2005 in American rugby union
2005 in Argentine rugby union